Stanislav Birner (born 11 October 1956) is a former professional tennis player from Czechoslovakia.  

He is married to Jana Birnerová and has two daughters, Eva Birnerová and Hanna Birnerová. Eva Birnerová played tennis until 2014 on professional level and reached No. 59 (singles) and 52 (doubles) in the world rankings. 

He lives in the Czech Republic. 

Birner enjoyed most of his tennis success while playing doubles. During his career, he won two doubles titles and achieved a career-high doubles ranking of world No. 43 in 1987.

Grand Slam finals

Mixed doubles: 1 runner-up

Career finals

Doubles (2 titles, 5 runner-ups)

External links
 
 

1956 births
Living people
Czech male tennis players
Czechoslovak male tennis players
Sportspeople from Karlovy Vary